Alex Witherden (born 10 September 1998) is a professional Australian rules footballer playing for the West Coast Eagles in the Australian Football League (AFL).

Early life
Witherden was a successful junior athlete in basketball and cricket but his biggest aspiration was to play in the AFL. He loved football so much that his mother forged his age in order to go to Auskick a year early. He regularly played football above his age group as a junior for Barwon Heads in the Bellarine Football League, mainly playing as a midfielder. 

In 2009 as a 10 year old he played under 12s and under 14s for Barwon Heads then he just played under 14s in 2010. In 2011 he moved to St Joseph's Football & Netball Club where he played two seasons of under 14s. Alex moved up to under 16s for 2013 and in 2014 he was named in the Vic Country team for the Under 16 National Championships. Witherden had arthroscopes on both hips at the end of the 2014 season.

2015 was when Witherden made his debut for the Geelong Falcons in the TAC Cup as a bottom age player, he played 12 games and kicked 5 goals. He also played in the AFL Academy game on AFL Grand Final day, drawing strong praise from coach Brenton Sanderson.

Witherden's draft year started off strongly in 2016, he was named the captain of the Geelong College 1st XVIII football team after an impressive season in 2015. Witherden played two Academy games and two Falcons games where he averaged 23 disposals and five marks per game in the TAC Cup, playing mostly as a skilful defender. Playing for Geelong College in early May, Witherden was sick before the game so he was playing forward. Geelong College was losing by about 90 points when Witherden decided to put himself into the midfield for a centre bounce. He broke his leg in a tackle from fellow AFL prospect Tim Taranto who was playing for St Kevin's. Witherden's leg was in an awkward position when Taranto came down on it with his full body weight, Alex was in severe pain and had to be stretchered off the ground. He broke one of the bones in his right leg in four places, cracked another one and tore the syndesmotic ligaments which connect them. The injury meant Witherden would finish the most important year of junior football having played just two games of TAC Cup. He missed the Under 18 National Championships, the Under 18 All Stars match and was in doubt for the National Draft Combine, to which he was invited. 

Witherden focused on his rehab, he rode an electric scooter around school as it was the best way to keep weight off his leg, he also hit the Geelong Falcons gym after dropping down to 75kg during his injury, his weight improved to 80kg and improved his diet, cutting down on his favourite, McDonald's frozen Coke plus ate less bread. One of his good friends Ash Morton (cousin of Cale, Mitch and Jarryd), used to tempt him with KFC lunch but he repeatedly refused. Where at one time he would have three or four sandwiches in his lunchbox, he then would opt for a chicken salad. He took advice during the setback from fellow draftee and friend Jy Simpkin, who broke his right leg a month earlier and Carlton player Darcy Lang who suffered a similar injury.

AFL career
He was drafted by Brisbane with pick 23 in the 2016 national draft. In 2018 Witherden became the 11th player to receive a second AFL Rising Star nomination after a match against .

Statistics
Statistics are correct to the end of 2020.

|- style="background-color: #EAEAEA"
! scope="row" style="text-align:center" | 2017
|style="text-align:center;"|
| 29 || 9 || 2 || 0 || 143 || 69 || 212 || 48 || 23 || 0.2 || 0.0 || 15.9 || 7.7 || 23.6 || 5.3 || 2.6
|- 
! scope="row" style="text-align:center" | 2018
|style="text-align:center;"|
| 29 || 21 || 1 || 3 || 336 || 135 || 471 || 152 || 34 || 0.1 || 0.2 || 16.0 || 6.4 || 22.4 || 7.2 || 1.6
|- style="background-color: #EAEAEA"
! scope="row" style="text-align:center" | 2019
|style="text-align:center;"|
| 29 || 23 || 2 || 3 || 332 || 89 || 421 || 127 || 38 || 0.2 || 0.0 || 14.4 || 3.8 || 18.2 || 5.5 || 1.6
|- 
! scope="row" style="text-align:center" | 2020
|style="text-align:center;"|
| 29 || 6 || - || - || 92 || 23 || 115 || 39 || 7 || 0.1 || 0.2 || 15.3 || 3.8 || 19.1 || 6.5 || 1.2
|- style="background-color: #EAEAEA"
! colspan=3| Career
! 59
! 5
! 6
! 903
! 316
! 1219
! 366
! 102
! 0.08
! 0.10
! 15.3
! 5.3
! 20.6
! 6.2
! 1.7
|}

References

External links

1998 births
Living people
Brisbane Lions players
Geelong Falcons players
Australian rules footballers from Victoria (Australia)
West Coast Eagles (WAFL) players
People educated at Geelong College